Green mamba may refer to:

 Eastern green mamba (Dendroaspis angusticeps), an arboreal snake found in the east of southern Africa and much of East Africa
 Western green mamba (Dendroaspis viridis), an arboreal snake found in the southern part of West Africa
 Jameson's mamba (Dendroaspis jamesoni), an arboreal snake found mainly in Western and Central Africa
 Green Mamba FC, a football club from Eswatini based in Simunye

Animal common name disambiguation pages